Turkmenistan had a total primary energy supply (TPES) of 26.75 Mtoe in 2014. Electricity consumption was 14.64 TWh. 
Most of this primary energy came from fossil fuels.
All of the electricity is generated with natural gas.

See also

 Ministry of Energy (Turkmenistan)

References